The World Muaythai Council (WMC) is one of the oldest and the largest professional sanctioning organizations of Muaythai in the world for the sport. The organization was set up in 1995 by parliament resolution, and is incorporated by the Royal Thai Government and sanctioned by the Sports Authority of Thailand, under the Ministry of Tourism and Sports. The council has been charged with the responsibility for the expansion of Muaythai worldwide. This involves supporting youth interest and athletes to learn the skills of Muaythai.

History
Set up by parliament resolution, the WMC is incorporated by the Royal Thai Government and sanctioned by the Sports Authority of Thailand, working together with the highest sport authorities of all member countries around the world to regulate all aspects of the art and sport of Muaythai. The inauguration meeting was held in 1995 at an appropriate venue, the United Nation Conference Centre with representatives from 39 countries attended. Presently there are 120 member countries registered with the WMC. The executive board and various committees ranging from technical and rules, refereeing and judging, medical, finance, youth, women, press and public relations, business and legal; all were democratically elected.

In 1996 an MOU was signed between the World Muaythai Council, the Amateur Muaythai Association of Thailand under Royal Patronage and the International Federation of Muaythai Amateur (IFMA) outlining that the 3 organisations will work closely together and support IFMA in getting muaythai into multi-sport events recognised by the IOC as well as GAISF recognition.

General Chetta the president of WMC at the time was Supreme Commander of the Royal Thai Army, later serving as Defence Minister and also the President of the National Olympic Committee of Thailand.

In 1997 a joint effort began between WMC, IFMA and the National Olympic Committee of Thailand to get muaythai recognised by the Olympic Council of Asia. As a result of this muaythai was included in the Asian Games as a demonstration sport then in 1999 the Olympic Council of Asia officially recognised muaythai under IFMA as an official sport.

In 1998 muaythai began the process to become an official recognised sport and to be included into GAISF. In the year 2000 a world meeting took place with WMC, IFMA, the National Olympic Committee of Thailand and Sports Authority of Thailand in which 106 countries participated to vote on the idea of applying for GAISF membership. With a vote of 102 against 4 the world muaythai community decided to apply under the word ‘muaythai’ as the official name of the sport. Also at this meeting a resolution was reached that IFMA will hold 2 thirds of all executive positions in the WMC worldwide with WMC Thailand keeping their autonomy.

The cooperation continued with annual events held in Thailand to celebrate the Kings, Queens and Prince's birthdays. In 2006, muaythai under IFMA was recognised by GAISF. In 2012 the WMC, IFMA and the Olympic Committee of Thailand started a campaign, muaythai towards highest recognition, applying for recognition to the International Olympic Committee and inclusion in the World Games. In 2014 muaythai got recognised by The World Games then in 2016 the IOC gave provisional recognition to IFMA.

In the year 2019 after muaythai got recognised by the International Olympic Committee, the World Muaythai Council merged with IFMA to represent the professional sector which was witnessed by representatives of over 100 countries, the IOC and the Sports Authority of Thailand to ensure full cooperation with WADA and ITA to protect the clean athletes.

Royal patronage
On August 20, 2014, Muaythai and the World Muaythai Council received official Royal Patronage from His Majesty King Bhumibol Adulyadej of Thailand. All government departments, sport and culture ministries, sport authorities, and all major Muaythai stadiums and promoters were invited to the historic event. 
PDG. General Saiyud Kerdphol, General Wimon Wongwanich the former President of WMC, General Chetta Thanajaro the current President of WMC, Dr Sakchye Tapsuwan IFMA President and WMC General Secretary, Khun Kajorn Prowsree Vice President of the Amateur Muaythai Association of Thailand under Royal Patronage of His Royal Highness the Crown Prince, Stephan Fox Vice President of WMC and General Secretary of the IFMA, and other notable VIPs were also in attendance. 
Over 20 representatives from the different embassies in Bangkok also came to witness the ceremony, along with representatives from the United Nations, among many other organizations. Along with Royal Patronage, the WMC logo was changed to include the Royal Insignia of His Majesty.

Current champions

Men's divisions

Male intercontinental champions

Male european champions

Women's divisions

Female intercontinental champions

Female european champions

See also
Rajadamnern Stadium
Lumpini Stadium

References

External links
Official website

Sports organizations established in 1995
1995 establishments in Thailand
Professional Muay Thai organizations
Sport in Thailand
Organizations based in Bangkok